Benjamin hielke de Roo (11 February 1940 – 17 May 2016) was an Australian gymnast. He was born in the Netherlands, but in 1957 his family emigrated to Australia. In 1960 he became an Australian citizen, and competed for Australia at the 1960 and 1964 Summer Olympics.

References

External links
Benjamin de Roo's obituary

1940 births
2016 deaths
Gymnasts at the 1960 Summer Olympics
Gymnasts at the 1964 Summer Olympics
Olympic gymnasts of Australia
Dutch emigrants to Australia
Naturalised citizens of Australia
Sportspeople from Enschede